William McAllister may refer to:
 William M. McAllister, American politician and jurist in Oregon
 William K. McAllister, American jurist in Illinois 
 William Balmer McAllister, Ontario businessman and political figure
 Billy McAllister (footballer), Scottish footballer

See also
 Billy McAllister, Australian boxer 
 William McAllister-Johnson, Canadian scholar of the history of prints and printmaking